Freestyle nunchaku refers to the use of the nunchaku weapon (used in martial arts and popularised by Bruce Lee and other martial artists) in a more visually stunning, rather than combative way. Nunchaku-do competitions are now held where marks are awarded based upon visual display rather than predefined kata.

There is a community of freestyle practitioners from around the world who, through collective experimentation and exploration, have compiled a comprehensive breakdown of freestyle and its parts.

Competitions

Freestyle is one of the disciplines of Nunchaku-Do (a sport based upon nunchaku combat freestyle and kata organized by the North American Nunchaku Association and the World nunchaku organization) freestyle routines are judged on the following criteria.

 Pace and rhythm of the nunchaku during the entire freestyle
 Constant of speed when performing the techniques
 Variation in techniques
 Control and movement
 Showmanship and entertainment
 The use of two nunchaku
 One risk element with one nunchaku
 One risk element with two nunchaku
 Unique nunchaku techniques
 The use of the entire competition field
 Budo spirit
 Dropping the nunchaku
 Time span of the freestyle

Underground tournaments and battles
The general interest in freestyle nunchaku has, concurrently with the increasing possibilities of sharing skills and techniques that online video sharing communities such provide, expanded to the point where a freestyle nunchaku movement autonomous from the World Nunchaku Organization has formed. Another, great source for foundational knowledge to begin swinging Nunchaku is the American Style Nunchaku System as taught on www.VirtualNunchaku.com.  

The Freestyle Nunchaku Forum (see above) holds tournaments that all members can participate in. These tournaments are held by participants submitting videos that adhere certain rules (which are relaxed, such as length of video and whether other weapons freestyle can be used). When all of the videos are in, members of the forum can vote on who they think is better. One tournament has categories based on skill level, while another is more traditional, where members are grouped and voters decide who is the better of the two in the groups. The annual "Chuck Off" also has varied categories such as: Singles, Doubles, Fire and Glow, and Director.  
The forum also hosts what are called Ladder Battles. Here participants are ranked by number. Those wanting to move up the ranks can challenge any of the three people above them to a "battle". The two people involved submit videos of their freestyle that adhere to certain rules that are agreed upon. Then, forum members have a certain length of time to vote on who they think is the best.

References

External links
 freestyleforum.net - International freestyle nunchaku forum
 nunchakututorials.com - A complete free site with all the freestyle tricks and moves

Object manipulation
Stick-fighting